Yin Na (born 3 February 1988 in Tianjin) is a female Chinese volleyball player.

Career
She was part of the silver medal winning teams at the 2013 World Grand Prix.

Clubs
  Tianjin Bridgestone (2005 - 2017)

Individual awards
 2011 Asian Club Championship "Best Spiker"
 2012 Asian Club Championship "Most Valuable Player"

References

External links
 FIVB profile

1988 births
Living people
Chinese women's volleyball players
Volleyball players from Tianjin
Asian Games medalists in volleyball
Volleyball players at the 2014 Asian Games
Asian Games silver medalists for China
Medalists at the 2014 Asian Games
Wing spikers
21st-century Chinese women